Suranga Paranavitana (born 17 July 1977) is a Sri Lankan cricketer. He made his Twenty20 debut on 6 January 2020, for Sri Lanka Navy Sports Club in the 2019–20 SLC Twenty20 Tournament.

References

External links
 

1977 births
Living people
Sri Lankan cricketers
Sri Lanka Navy Sports Club cricketers
Place of birth missing (living people)